Afrosolen is a genus of flowering plants belonging to the family Iridaceae.

Its native range is Nigeria to Eritrea and Southern Africa.

Species:

Afrosolen abyssinicus 
Afrosolen avasmontanus 
Afrosolen bainesii 
Afrosolen coeruleus 
Afrosolen erongoensis 
Afrosolen erythranthus 
Afrosolen gracilis 
Afrosolen masukuensis 
Afrosolen otaviensis 
Afrosolen rivularis 
Afrosolen sandersonii 
Afrosolen schimperi 
Afrosolen setifolius 
Afrosolen teretifolius 
Afrosolen zambesiacus

References

Iridaceae
Iridaceae genera